"The Commission" is a song performed by American Christian country band Cain. The song was released on December 11, 2021, as the third single from their debut studio album, Rise Up (2021). The song was written by Blake Neesmith, Carter Frodge, Logan Cain, Madison Cain, Nick Schwarz, and Taylor Cain.

"The Commission" peaked at number two on the US Hot Christian Songs chart.

Background
On November 29, 2021, the radio team of Provident Label Group announced that "The Commission" will be serviced to Christian radio in the United States, the official add date for the single slated on December 31, 2021. 

The song is about the Great Commission, drawing inspiration from Matthew 28:19–20. Taylor Cain Matz shared the story behind the song, saying: 

On April 15, 2022, Cain released a new version of "The Commission" featuring Cody Carnes, accompanied with its lyric video.

Composition

Accolades

Commercial performance
"The Commission" made its debut at number 30 on the US Christian Airplay chart dated December 18, 2021, being the highest ranking debut that week.

"The Commission" debuted at number 50 on the US Hot Christian Songs chart dated January 8, 2022.

Music videos
The official audio video of "The Commission" was published on Cain's YouTube channel on March 6, 2020. The Song Session video of the song was availed by Essential Worship on March 16, 2020, to YouTube. The official acoustic performance video of the song was published by Cain on YouTube on May 21, 2021. The official lyric video of the song was published by Cain on YouTube on June 11, 2021.

The official music video for "The Commission" premiered on Cain's YouTube channel on December 10, 2021. The music video was filmed on the set of the television drama The Chosen in Utah, the song being featured on a Christmas special episode titled "Christmas With The Chosen: The Messengers".

Cain published the official lyric video for the version of "The Commission" featuring Cody Carnes on April 15, 2022.

Track listing

Charts

Weekly charts

Year-end charts

Release history

References

External links
 
 

2020 songs
2021 singles
Cody Carnes songs